MCO may refer to:

Abbreviations
 Malaysian movement control order, a lockdown measure by Malaysia during COVID-19 pandemic
 Managed Care Organization
 Manitoba Chamber Orchestra
 Manufacturer’s Certificate of Origin
 Marine Corps Order
 Mars Climate Orbiter
 MC Oran, an Algerian association football club 
 MC Oujda, a Moroccan association football club
 Millennial Choirs and Orchestras
 MinecraftOnline, a Minecraft multiplayer server
 Miscellaneous Charges Order, a coupon used to process the payment of travel arrangements
 Modern Chess Openings, a reference book on chess openings
 Moscow Chamber Orchestra
 Motorsport Club of Ottawa
 Motor City Online, a massively multiplayer online racing game

Codes
 MCO, the IATA airport code for Orlando International Airport
 MCO, the ISO 3166 trigram for the country of Monaco
 MCO, the ISO 639-3 code for Coatlán Mixe
 MCO, the NYSE code for Moody's Corporation
 MCO, the UK National Rail station code for Manchester Oxford Road railway station